Audioboxer is the debut EP released by Something Corporate on October 2, 2001 by Drive-Thru Records. "Punk Rock Princess" was released as a single the following day.

Track listing
All lyrics written by Andrew McMahon, except "(Hurricane) The Formal Weather Pattern", written by Josh Partington, all music composed by Something Corporate.

Personnel

Band
 Andrew McMahon - lead vocals, piano
 Josh Partington - lead guitar
 William Tell - rhythm guitar, backing vocals
 Kevin "Clutch" Page - bass
 Brian Ireland - drums, percussion

Additional Musicians
 Christopher Brady - String Arrangements
 Charlie Bisharat - violin
 Peter Kent - violin
 Darrin McCann - viola
 Steve Richards - cello

Production
Jim Wirt - Production, Engineering and Mixing
P.J. Smith - Assistant Engineering
Joel Ausbrooks - Assistant Engineering
Don Tyler - Mastering

Design
Tim Stedman - Art Direction, Design
Justin Stephens - Photography
Marco Orozco - Design

References

Something Corporate albums
2001 debut EPs
Drive-Thru Records EPs